Cromorne is a French woodwind reed instrument of uncertain identity, used in the early Baroque period in French court music. The name is sometimes confused with the similar-sounding name crumhorn, a musical woodwind instrument probably of different design, called "tournebout" by French theorists in the 17th century.

Crumhorn

By contrast, the crumhorn (also known by names including crum horn, crumm horn, Krummhorn, Krummpfeife, Kumbhorn, cornamuto torto, and piva torto) is a capped double-reed instrument usually shaped like a letter "J" and possessing a rather small melodic range spanning a ninth (i.e. just over an octave) unless extended downward by keys or by the technique of underblowing, which increases the range by a perfect fifth. However, this instrument was apparently little used in England—despite listings in the inventories of Henry VIII and the earls of Arundel at Nonsuch House, and mention in a poem by Sir William Leighton, they are conspicuously absent from inventories and other documents of English town waits—or France and was called a "tournebout" by French theorists including Mersenne (1636), Pierre Trichet (ca 1640), and even as late as Diderot (1767).

References

Sources

Further reading

Woodwind instruments
Early musical instruments